Adolfo Luis Yedro (14 December 1922 – 20 February 1989) was an Argentine rower. He competed in the men's coxed four event at the 1948 Summer Olympics.

References

External links
 

1922 births
1989 deaths
Argentine male rowers
Olympic rowers of Argentina
Rowers at the 1948 Summer Olympics
Sportspeople from Rosario, Santa Fe
Pan American Games medalists in rowing
Pan American Games gold medalists for Argentina
Rowers at the 1951 Pan American Games